The Florida Complex League Orioles are a Rookie-level affiliate of the Baltimore Orioles, competing in the Florida Complex League of Minor League Baseball. Before 2021, the team was known as the Gulf Coast League Orioles. The team plays its home games in Sarasota, Florida, at Ed Smith Stadium, which became the spring training home to the major-league Orioles at the start of the 2010 season.

History
The team first competed from 1991 to 2003 in the Gulf Coast League. After not fielding a team for three seasons, the team returned in 2007 and has competed continuously since then. The team has qualified for the postseason twice, in 1991 and 2011, and has yet to capture a league title.

Before the 2021 season, the league was renamed as the Florida Complex League. For the 2021 season, the Orioles are fielding two squads in the league, differentiated as "Black" and "Orange" in reference to the team's colors.

Season by season

Rosters

References

External links
 Official website

Baltimore Orioles minor league affiliates
Baseball teams established in 1991
Florida Complex League teams
Orioles
1991 establishments in Florida